Zhang Guangren (2 March 1911 – 10 January 1993) was a Chinese politician. She was one of the first group of women elected to the Legislative Yuan in 1948.

Biography
After earning a BA at Fudan University in Shanghai, she became headteacher of the Henan Private Songyue Middle School and head of Kaifeng Women's Vocational School. She also served as a director of the Henan branch of the Chinese Women's Culture and Education Association and was a member of the Chinese branch of the Pan Pacific and Southeast Asian Women's Association. In the 1948 parliamentary elections, Zhang was elected to the Legislative Yuan from Henan Province. She relocated to Taiwan during the Chinese Civil War and died in 1993.

References

1911 births
Fudan University alumni
Chinese educators
20th-century Chinese women politicians
Members of the 1st Legislative Yuan
Members of the 1st Legislative Yuan in Taiwan
1993 deaths